Câțcău is a commune in Cluj County, Transylvania, Romania. It is composed of three villages: Câțcău, Muncel (Kishavas) and Sălișca (Szelecske).

Demographics 
According to the census from 2002 there was a total population of 2,498 people living in this town. Of this population, 94.43% are ethnic Romanians,  3.16% are ethnic Hungarians and 2.28% undeclared.

References 

Communes in Cluj County
Localities in Transylvania